José Luis Oliveros Usabiaga (born 8 May 1983) is a Mexican politician affiliated with the PAN. As of 2013, he served as Deputy of the LXII Legislature of the Mexican Congress representing Guanajuato.

References

1983 births
Living people
Politicians from Guanajuato
National Action Party (Mexico) politicians
21st-century Mexican politicians
Deputies of the LXII Legislature of Mexico
Members of the Chamber of Deputies (Mexico) for Guanajuato